Porsche Engineering (Porsche Engineering Group GmbH) was established in 2001 as a wholly owned subsidiary of Porsche AG, with headquarters in Weissach, and traces its history back to 1931 when Porsche created its first engineering office subsidiary. Porsche Engineering Group has been re-organized into Porsche Consulting (subsidiary of Porsche AG) and Porsche Engineering (subsidiary of Porsche SE).

Porsche Engineering has offered consultancy services to various other car manufacturers for many years including Audi, Mercedes-Benz, Opel, Studebaker, SEAT, and Zastava Automobiles. Since 2012 the company has managed the former FIAT owned Nardò Ring in Italy.

Notable non-Porsche products

 Torsion bar suspension developed by Porsche, was patented in 1931
 Lada Samara was partly developed by Porsche in 1984
 SEAT Ibiza engine in 1984
 Harley-Davidson Revolution 60-degree v-twin water-cooled engine and gearbox that is used in their V-Rod motorcycle
 Audi RS2 1993
 C88 a prototype family car designed in 1994 by Porsche for the Chinese government
 Opel Zafira complete vehicle development resulting in the Zafira A launched in 1998
 Second-gen Scania PRT - PE designed for Scania a completely new cab for its PRT, along with other parts.
 Kortezh engine
Note: Mercedes-Benz OM602 engine was designed by Ferdinand Piëch after he left Porsche.

References

External links

Porsche